Frank Leslie Cross  (22 January 1900 – 30 December 1968) was an English patristics scholar and Anglican priest. He was the founder of the Oxford International Conference on Patristic Studies and editor (with Elizabeth Livingstone) of The Oxford Dictionary of the Christian Church (first edition, 1957). He was Lady Margaret Professor of Divinity at the University of Oxford from 1944 to 1968.

Life 
Cross was born in Honiton on 22 January 1900 to the pharmacist Herbert Francis Cross and his wife Louisa Georgina. The family moved to Bournemouth whilst he was a child, where he won the Domus scholarship for natural science at Balliol College, Oxford, taking honours in chemistry and crystallography and then, in 1922, following tuition at Keble College, Oxford, first-class honours in theology. He studied in Marburg and Freiburg im Breisgau, taking a Doctor of Philosophy degree at Oxford in 1930 with a dissertation on Edmund Husserl. He became an ordinand of Ripon College Cuddesdon in 1923 and was ordained in 1925 as tutor and chaplain of that college. In 1927 he became one of the priest-librarians of Pusey House, Oxford, of which he became Custodian in 1934. He was appointed Lady Margaret Professor of Divinity and Canon of Christ Church, Oxford, in 1944, by which time his interest in patristics was developing, alongside the beginnings of The Oxford Dictionary of the Christian Church, which was published in 1957. At the time of his death he was working on the second edition.

Post-war he organised international conferences, initially to re-establish relations with Christians in Germany. He organized the First International Conference on Patristic Studies in 1951, the second in 1955 and served as editor of the first 11 volumes of Studia Patristica, the official publication of the conference. Additionally, he also organized New Testament congresses. As well as their academic importance, the conferences were an early expression of ecumenism.

Cross was awarded an Oxford Doctor of Divinity degree in 1950; he received honorary degrees from the University of Aberdeen and the University of Bonn and was elected a Fellow of the British Academy in 1967.

Cross died on 30 December 1968 in Oxford. Near the end of his life his two sisters became his caretakers.

Selected works

References

External links 

 Brief biography of Frank Leslie Cross and introduction to the Cross Collection held by the National Library of Australia

1900 births
1968 deaths
20th-century Anglican theologians
20th-century English Anglican priests
20th-century English theologians
Alumni of Balliol College, Oxford
Alumni of Keble College, Oxford
English Anglican theologians
English book editors
Fellows of the British Academy
Lady Margaret Professors of Divinity
Patristic scholars
Clergy from Bournemouth
People from Honiton